Plainsfield Camp (or Park Plantation or Cockercombe Castle) is a possible Iron Age earthwork on the Quantock Hills near Aisholt in Somerset, England.

The so-called hill fort has several features that make it more likely to be an animal enclosure, than a defended settlement:
 single rampart with ditch
 simple opening for an entrance
 situated on the slope of a hill
 the hill rises over 50 m above the ring
 the area is only 

The case for an enclosure is less clear cut than for Trendle Ring, since Plainsfield is on a spur and does have steep slopes on two sides, making it like a promontory fort, similar to nearby Ruborough.

It is a Scheduled Ancient Monument.

Background

Hill forts developed in the Late Bronze and Early Iron Age, roughly the start of the first millennium BC. The reason for their emergence in Britain, and their purpose, has been a subject of debate. It has been argued that they could have been military sites constructed in response to invasion from continental Europe, sites built by invaders, or a military reaction to social tensions caused by an increasing population and consequent pressure on agriculture. The dominant view since the 1960s has been that the increasing use of iron led to social changes in Britain. Deposits of iron ore were located in different places to the tin and copper ore necessary to make bronze, and as a result trading patterns shifted and the old elites lost their economic and social status. Power passed into the hands of a new group of people. Archaeologist Barry Cunliffe believes that population increase still played a role and has stated "[the forts] provided defensive possibilities for the community at those times when the stress [of an increasing population] burst out into open warfare. But I wouldn't see them as having been built because there was a state of war. They would be functional as defensive strongholds when there were tensions and undoubtedly some of them were attacked and destroyed, but this was not the only, or even the most significant, factor in their construction".

See also 
 Ruborough
 Dowsborough
 Trendle Ring
List of hill forts and ancient settlements in Somerset

References

 A Field Guide to Somerset Archaeology, Lesley and Roy Adkins (1992) 
 The Archaeology of Somerset, Michael Aston and Ian Burrow (Eds) (1982)

External links
Plainsfield Camp Somerset Historic Environment Record (Site no. 11128)

Hill forts in Somerset
History of Somerset
Scheduled monuments in Sedgemoor